The 2018 Asian Women's Volleyball Cup, so-called 2018 AVC Cup for Women was the sixth edition of the Asian Cup, a biennial international volleyball tournament organised by the Asian Volleyball Confederation (AVC) with Thailand Volleyball Association (TVA). The tournament was held in Nakhon Ratchasima, Thailand from 16 to 23 September 2018.

As hosts, Thailand automatically qualified for the tournament, while the remaining 9 teams, qualified from the 2017 Asian Women's Volleyball Championship in Biñan and Muntinlupa, Philippines.

Qualification

The ten AVC member associations participated in the tournament with Thailand already qualified as host country, and the nine remaining teams qualified from the 2017 Asian Women's Volleyball Championship. The ten AVC member associations were from three zonal associations, including, Central Asia (2 teams), East Asia (4 teams), Oceania (1 team) and Southeast Asia (3 teams). While any West Asian teams did not participate the tournament's qualification.

Qualified teams
The following teams qualified for the tournament.

Pools composition

Venue
All matches will be held at Korat Chatchai Hall, Nakhon Ratchasima.

Squads

Preliminary round

Pool standing procedure
 Number of matches won
 Match points
 Sets ratio
 Points ratio
 Result of the last match between the tied teams

Match won 3–0 or 3–1: 3 match points for the winner, 0 match points for the loser
Match won 3–2: 2 match points for the winner, 1 match point for the loser

Pool A

Pool B

Pool C

Rankings

Classification round

Classification round (R5-R10)

Section 1
Winners will advance to the 5th-8th Classification.
Losers will be relegated to the 9th-place match.

Section 2
Both teams will advance to the 5th-8th Classification.
Loser will face the winner of Kazakhstan vs Vietnam.
Winner will face the winner of Philippines vs South Korea.

9th place

5th-8th Classification

5th-8th place

7th place

5th place

Final round

Play-offs

Quarter-finals

Semi-finals

3rd place

Final

Final standing

Awards

Most Valuable Player
 Liu Yanhan
Best Outside Spikers
 Miwako Osanai
 Ajcharaporn Kongyot
Best Setter
 Sun Haiping

Best Opposite Spiker
 Pimpichaya Kokram
Best Middle Blocker
 Gao Yi
 Tseng Wan-Ling
Best Libero
 Rena Mizusugi

Source: AVC

See also
2018 Asian Men's Volleyball Cup
2018 Asian Women's Volleyball Challenge Cup

References

External links
 Asian Volleyball Confederation
 2018 Asian Women’s Volleyball Cup match schedule

2018
Asian Cup
International volleyball competitions hosted by Thailand
Vo
September 2018 sports events in Asia